Peacock orchid is a common name for several orchids and may refer to:

Pleione (plant)
Psychilis